In mathematics and especially in combinatorics, a plane partition is a two-dimensional array of nonnegative integers  (with positive integer indices i and j) that is nonincreasing in both indices. This means that
Moreover, only finitely many of the  may be nonzero.  Plane partitions are a generalization of partitions of an integer.

A plane partition may be represented visually by the placement of a stack of  unit cubes above the point (i, j) in the plane, giving a three-dimensional solid as shown in the picture. The image has matrix form

Plane partitions are also often described by the positions of the unit cubes.

The sum of a plane partition is

The sum describes the number of cubes of which the plane partition consists.  Much interest in plane partitions concerns the enumeration of plane partitions in various classes.  The number of plane partitions with sum n is denoted by PL(n).  For example, there are six plane partitions with sum 3

so PL(3) = 6.

Plane partitions may be classified by how symmetric they are.  Many symmetric classes of plane partitions are enumerated by simple product formulas.

Generating function of plane partitions 

The generating function for PL(n) is
.
It is sometimes referred to as the MacMahon function, as it was discovered by Percy A. MacMahon.

This formula may be viewed as the 2-dimensional analogue of Euler's product formula for the number of integer partitions of n. There is no analogous formula known for partitions in higher dimensions (i.e., for solid partitions). The asymptotics for plane partitions were first calculated by E. M. Wright. One obtains, for large , that

Evaluating numerically yields

Plane partitions in a box 

Around 1896, MacMahon set up the generating function of plane partitions that are subsets of the  box  in his first paper on plane partitions. The formula is given by

A proof of this formula can be found in the book Combinatory Analysis written by MacMahon. MacMahon also mentions the generating functions of plane partitions. The formula for the generating function can be written in an alternative way, which is given by

The planar case (when t = 1) yields the binomial coefficients:
 

The general solution is

Special plane partitions 

Special plane partitions include symmetric, cyclic and self-complementary plane partitions, and combinations of these properties.

In the subsequent sections, the enumeration of special sub-classes of plane partitions inside a box are considered.

Action of S2, S3 and C3 on plane partitions 

 is the group of permutations acting on the first two coordinates of a point. This group contains the identity, which sends (i, j, k) to itself, and the transposition (i, j, k) → (j, i, k). The height of an element (i, j, k) is defined by

The height increases by one for each step away from the back right corner. For example, the corner position (1, 1, 1) has height 1 and ht(2, 1, 1) = 2.  The height of an orbit is defined to be the height of any element in the orbit. This notation of the height differs from the notation of Ian G. Macdonald.	

There is a natural action of the permutation group  on a Ferrers diagram of a plane partition—this corresponds to simultaneously permuting the three coordinates of all nodes. This generalizes the conjugation operation for integer partitions. The action of  can generate new plane partitions starting from a given plane partition. Below there are shown six plane partitions of 4 that are generated by the  action. Only the exchange of the first two coordinates is manifest in the representation given below.

 is called the group of cyclic permutations and consists of

Symmetric plane partitions 

A plane partition  is called symmetric if i,j = j,i for all i, j. In other words, a plane partition is symmetric if  if and only if . Plane partitions of this type are symmetric with respect to the plane x = y. Below is an example of a symmetric plane partition and its visualisation.

 

This conjecture is called The MacMahon conjecture. The generating function is given by

Macdonald pointed out that Percy A. MacMahon's conjecture reduces to

 

In 1972 Edward A. Bender and Donald E. Knuth conjectured a simple closed form for the generating function for plane partition which have at most r rows and strict decrease along the rows. George Andrews showed that the conjecture of Bender and Knuth and the MacMahon conjecture are equivalent. MacMahon's conjecture was proven almost simultaneously by George Andrews in 1977 and later Ian G. Macdonald presented an alternative proof. When setting q = 1 yields the counting function  which is given by

 

For a proof of the case q = 1 please refer to George Andrews' paper MacMahon's conjecture on symmetric plane partitions.

Cyclically symmetric plane partitions 

The i-th row is regarded as an ordinary partition. The conjugate of a partition  is the partition whose diagram is the transpose of partition . Below an example of a cyclically symmetric plane partition and its visualization is given.

 

Macdonald's conjecture provides a formula for calculating the number of cyclically symmetric plane partitions for a given integer r. This conjecture is called The Macdonald conjecture.

 

This equation can also be written in another way

 

In 1979, Andrews proved Macdonald's conjecture for the case q = 1 as the "weak" Macdonald conjecture. Three years later William. H. Mills, David Robbins and Howard Rumsey proved the general case of Macdonald's conjecture in their paper Proof of the Macdonald conjecture.

Totally symmetric plane partitions 

A totally symmetric plane partition  is a plane partition which is symmetric and cyclically symmetric. Below an example of a matrix for a totally symmetric plane partition is given. The picture shows the visualisation of the matrix.

 

The formula is given by

 

Around 1983 Andrews and Robbins independently stated an explicit product formula for the orbit-counting generating function for totally symmetric plane partitions. This formula already alluded to in George E. Andrews' paper Totally symmetric plane partitions which was published 1980. The conjecture is called The q-TSPP conjecture and it is given by:

Let  be the symmetric group. The orbit counting function for totally symmetric plane partitions that fit inside  is given by the formula

 

This conjecture was proved in 2011 by Christoph Koutschan, Manuel Kauers and Doron Zeilberger.

Self-complementary plane partitions 

It is necessary that the product  is even. Below an example of a self-complementary symmetric plane partition and its visualisation is given.

 

Richard P. Stanley conjectured formulas for the total number of self-complementary plane partitions . According to Stanley, Robbins also formulated formulas for the total number of self-complementary plane partitions in a different but equivalent form.

 

 

 

It is necessary that the product of r,s and t is even. A proof can be found in the paper Symmetries of Plane Partitions which was written by Stanley. The proof works with Schur functions . This is a special case of Stanley's hook-content formula. The generating function for self-complementary plane partitions is given by

 

Substituting this formula in

 

 

 

supplies the desired q-analogue case.

Cyclically symmetric self-complementary plane partitions 

A plane partition  is called cyclically symmetric self-complementary if it is cyclically symmetric and self-complementary. The figure presents a cyclically symmetric self-complementary plane partition and the according matrix is below.

 

The total number of cyclically symmetric self-complementary plane partitions is given by

 

 is the number of  alternating sign matrices.

 

Totally symmetric self-complementary plane partitions 

A totally symmetric self-complementary plane partition is a plane partition that is both totally symmetric and self-complementary. For instance, the matrix below is such a plane partition; it is visualised in the accompanying picture.

 

The formula  was conjectured by William H. Mills, Robbins and Howard Rumsey in their work Self-Complementary Totally Symmetric Plane Partitions. The total number of totally symmetric self-complementary plane partitions is given by

 

Andrews proves this formula in 1994 in his paper Plane Partitions V: The TSSCPP Conjecture.

See also 
 Gaussian binomial coefficients
 Voxel

References 

 G. Andrews, The Theory of Partitions, Cambridge University Press, Cambridge, 1998, 

 I.G. Macdonald, Symmetric Functions and Hall Polynomials, Oxford University Press, Oxford, 1999, 
 P.A. MacMahon, Combinatory analysis, 2 vols, Cambridge University Press, 1915–16.

External links

 The DLMF page on Plane Partitions 

Enumerative combinatorics
Integer partitions